After the Dance is a 1935 American Proto-Noir, crime romance drama film melodrama directed by Leo Bulgakov and starring Nancy Carroll, George Murphy and Thelma Todd.

Main cast
 Nancy Carroll as Anne Taylor  
 George Murphy as Jerry Davis  
 Thelma Todd as Mabel Kane 
 Jack La Rue as Mitch  
 Arthur Hohl as Louie  
 Wyrley Birch as Warden  
 Thurston Hall as District Attorney  
 Victor Kilian as Kennedy  
 Robert Middlemass as King  
 George McKay as Danny 
 Virginia Sale as Edna

References

Bibliography
 Paul L. Nemcek. The films of Nancy Carroll. 1969.

External links
 

1935 films
1935 drama films
1930s English-language films
American drama films
Films directed by Leo Bulgakov
American black-and-white films
Columbia Pictures films
1930s American films